Graphops nebulosa is a species of leaf beetle. It is found in North America.

References

Further reading

 

Eumolpinae
Articles created by Qbugbot
Beetles described in 1859
Taxa named by John Lawrence LeConte
Beetles of North America